Karl Gengler (8 October 1886 – 9 October 1974) was a German politician of the Christian Democratic Union (CDU) and former member of the German Bundestag.

Life 
From the first election until 1957 he was a member of the German Bundestag. He won the direct mandate in the Rottweil constituency in both 1949 and 1953. In the Bundestag he was deputy chairman of the Committee on Rules of Procedure and Immunity.

Literature

References

1886 births
1974 deaths
Members of the Bundestag for Baden-Württemberg
Members of the Bundestag 1953–1957
Members of the Bundestag 1949–1953
Members of the Bundestag for the Christian Democratic Union of Germany
Members of the Landtag of Württemberg